Škoda Auto Volkswagen India Private Limited is the wholly owned Indian subsidiary of German automotive manufacturing company Volkswagen Group.

On 7 October 2019, Volkswagen Group India announced the merger of their three Indian subsidiaries - Volkswagen India Pvt Ltd (VWIPL), Volkswagen Group Sales India Pvt Ltd (NSC) and Škoda Auto India Pvt Ltd (SAIPL) - into a single entity named Škoda Auto Volkswagen India Pvt Ltd with headquarters at Pune. Gurpratap Boparai was appointed as the first Managing Director of Škoda Auto Volkswagen India.

They focus on manufacture and sales of Volkswagen, Audi and Škoda vehicles in India. Volkswagen Group brands Porsche and Lamborghini also sell their cars in India through them.

Production facilities
The company operates two manufacturing plants. The first plant at Chakan, near Pune, Maharashtra was previously owned by Volkswagen India with an annual capacity of 200,000 vehicles. The other plant in Aurangabad, Maharashtra was previously operated by Škoda Auto India and mainly used for CKD assembly of Volkswagen, Škoda and Audi vehicles. In 2020, Škoda launched their first ever imported compact SUV model, the Karoq.

Volkswagen has an engine assembly facility (an extension to the previously mentioned plant) built in 2015 at a cost of 240 crore (710 million euro) approximately at their state-of-the-art factory in Chakan, Pune respectively. The plant reportedly holds production capacity of about 98,000 engines annually.

Models

Škoda Auto

Current models

Discontinued models
 Škoda Octavia  (2002-2023) 
 Škoda Superb  (2004-2023) 
 Škoda Octavia Combi  (2005-2008) 
 Skoda Laura  (2005-2013) 
 Škoda Fabia  (2008-2013) 
 Škoda Yeti  (2010-2017) 
 Škoda Rapid  (2011-2021) 
 Škoda Karoq  (2020-2021)

Volkswagen

Current models

Discontinued models 
Volkswagen New Beetle (2007–2013, imported)
Volkswagen Phaeton (2007–2013, imported)
Volkswagen Passat (2007–2020)
Volkswagen Touareg (2008–2013, imported)
Volkswagen Jetta (2008–2017)
Volkswagen Beetle (2009–2017, imported)
Volkswagen Polo (2010–2022)
Volkswagen Vento (2010–2022)
Volkswagen Polo GTI (2016–2018, imported)
Volkswagen Ameo (2016–2020)  
Volkswagen T-Roc (2020–2021, imported)
Volkswagen Tiguan Allspace (2020–2021, imported)

Audi 

Audi India was established in March 2007 as a division of Volkswagen Group Sales India. Audi is represented in 110 countries worldwide and since 2004, Audi has been selling its products on the Indian market.

In March 2007, Audi set up its own sales company for India. By establishing Audi India as a division of Volkswagen Group Sales India Pvt. Ltd. in Mumbai. Audi is making a clear long-term statement in the country with ambitious growths plans. Audi's goal is to become the leading automobile luxury brand in the Indian market, and has been since 2015.

The Audi India strategy encompasses significant investments in branding, marketing, manufacturing (locally assemble engines to cut down its import bill in a range of 10–30%), exclusive dealerships and after sales services. In 2007, only 2 percent of the new car buyers in India knew Audi. In 2008, it went up to 13 percent.

Assembled locally (CKD) 
Audi A4 (2008–present)
Audi A6 (2009–present)
Audi Q5 (2021–present)
Audi Q7 (2013–present)

Imported
Audi A7
Audi A8
Audi Q3
Audi Q5
Audi TT
Audi RS5
Audi RS7
Audi R8
Audi E-tron
Audi E-tron GT/Audi RS E-tron GT

Porsche
Porsche 911
Porsche Boxster
Porsche Cayman
Porsche Cayenne
Porsche Panamera
Porsche Macan
Porsche Taycan

See also
Automobile industry in India

References

External links
Volkswagen India Private Limited

India
Vehicle manufacturing companies established in 2001
Car manufacturers of India
Manufacturing companies based in Pune
Indian companies established in 2001
Indian subsidiaries of foreign companies
2001 establishments in Maharashtra